Coq au vin ("rooster/cock with wine") is a French dish of chicken braised with wine, lardons, mushrooms, and optionally garlic.
A red Burgundy wine is typically used, though many regions of France make variants using local wines, such as coq au vin jaune (Jura), coq au riesling (Alsace), coq au pourpre or coq au violet (Beaujolais nouveau), and coq au Champagne.

History
Various legends trace coq au vin to ancient Gaul and Julius Caesar, but the recipe was not documented until the early 20th century; it is generally accepted that it existed as a rustic dish long before that. A somewhat similar recipe, poulet au vin blanc, appeared in an 1864 cookbook.

Simone Beck, Louisette Bertholle and Julia Child included coq au vin in their 1961 cookbook Mastering the Art of French Cooking, and Child prepared it twice on the PBS cooking show The French Chef.  This exposure helped to increase the visibility and popularity of the dish in the United States, and coq au vin was seen as one of Child's signature dishes.

Preparation
Although the word coq in French means "rooster" or "cock", and tough birds with much connective tissue benefit from braising, coq au vin may be made with any poultry, most commonly chicken.

Standard recipes call for red wine (often Burgundy) for braising, lardons, button mushrooms, onions, often garlic, and sometimes brandy. Recipes with vin jaune may specify morels instead of white mushrooms. The preparation is similar in many respects to beef bourguignon. The chicken is seasoned, sometimes floured, seared in fat and slowly simmered in wine until tender. The usual seasonings are salt, pepper, thyme, parsley, and bay leaf, usually in the form of a bouquet garni. The juices are thickened either with a roux or by adding blood at the end.

See also

 Fujian red wine chicken
 List of chicken dishes
 List of stews
 Wine sauce

References

External links

Blood dishes
French chicken dishes
French stews
Wine dishes